Jean-Claude Lord (6 June 1943 – 15 January 2022) was a Canadian film director and screenwriter. He was one of the most commercial of the Québécois directors in the 1970s, aiming his feature films at a mass audience and dealing with political themes in a mainstream, Hollywood style.

Early life
Lord was born in Montreal on 6 June 1943.  He first worked as an assistant director and scriptwriter in the private sector.  He was an apprentice to Pierre Patry at the company Coopératio.

Career
Lord's first feature was Délivrez-nous du mal, released in 1965.  It depicted a gay couple, reportedly a first for a Québécois film and regarded as a breakthrough since the influence of the Catholic Church was still strong in Quebec.  His 1974 film Bingo exploits the post-October Crisis, post-Watergate paranoia prevalent in North America at the time with considerable panache.  It was the subject of an intensive critical debate about its credentials as a left-wing film.

Lord directed his first English-language film, Visiting Hours, in 1982.  The low-budget horror movie, which featured William Shatner and Michael Ironside, became a cult favourite.  Four years later, Lord worked for the first time in television on the series Lance et Compte.  It centred around a fictitious ice hockey team, whose uniforms were similar to the Quebec Nordiques, contending for the Stanley Cup and the World Cup of Hockey.  The series – which ran from 1986 to 1989 – was credited with establishing a new benchmark for television shows in Quebec.  It also aired in English on CBC as He Shoots, He Scores, and was shown in France in 1987.  He won a Prix Gémeaux in 1987 for the series.

Lord subsequently worked primarily in television on several other series and made-for-TV movies.  He directed the revival of Lance et Compte that aired from 2000 until 2008.  He was conferred the Prix Guy-Mauffette by the National Assembly of Quebec in November 2017, in recognition of the contributions he made to the audiovisual industry and culture.

Personal life
Lord was in a domestic partnership with Lise Thouin until his death.  Together, they had two children: Marie-Noëlle and Jean-Sébastien, who is also a film and television director, most noted for the films Heaven (Le petit ciel) and Guardian Angel (L'Ange-gardien).

Lord died on the evening of 15 January 2022.  He was 78, and had suffered a major stroke on 30 December of the previous year.

Filmography

Features
Deliver Us from Evil (Délivrez-nous du mal) – 1969
The Doves (Les Colombes) – 1972
Bingo – 1974
Let's Talk About Love (Parlez-nous d'amour) – 1976
Panic (Panique) – 1977
Chocolate Eclair (Éclair au chocolat) – 1979
Visiting Hours – 1982
Covergirl – 1984
The Vindicator – 1986
Toby McTeague – 1986
The Tadpole and the Whale (La Grenouille et la baleine) – 1988
Mindfield (La mémoire assassinée) – 1989
Eddie and the Cruisers II: Eddie Lives! – 1989
 – 1992
North Station (Station Nord) – 2002

Television
Lance et Compte (TV series, 1986) {aka He Shoots, He Scores (English) and Cogne et Gagne (France)}
Urban Angel (TV series, 1991)
Sirens (TV series, 1994–1995)
Jasmine (TV series, 1996)
Lobby (TV series, 1997)
Diva (TV series, 1997)
Maurice Richard: Histoire d'un Canadien (TV miniseries Co-Directed with Pauline Payette, 1999)
Quadra (TV series, 2000)
L'or (TV series, 2001)
Galidor: Defenders of the Outer Dimension (TV series, 2002)
Lance et Compte: La nouvelle génération (TV series, 2002)
Lance et Compte: La reconquete (TV series, 2004)
Lance et Compte: La revanche (TV series, 2006)
Lance et Compte: Le grand duel (TV series, 2009)
Secrets of the Summer House (TV movie, 2008)
Out of Control (TV movie, 2009)
Ring of Deceit (TV movie, 2009)
Second Chances (TV movie, 2010)

References

External links

1943 births
2022 deaths
Canadian screenwriters in French
Canadian television directors
Film directors from Montreal
French Quebecers
Writers from Montreal
20th-century Canadian screenwriters
20th-century Canadian male writers
21st-century Canadian screenwriters
21st-century Canadian male writers